Simond is a French surname. Notable people with the surname include:

 André Simond (born 1929), French alpine skier
 Jean-Christophe Simond (born 1960), French figure skater and coach
 François Simond (born 1969), French alpine skier
 George Simond (1867–1941), English tennis player
 Paul-Louis Simond, French physician and biologist
 Pierre Simond, (1651-1720) French Huguenot church Minister

See also 
 Simon (disambiguation)
 Symon
 Simons

French-language surnames